Gilstrap Township is a township in Adams County, North Dakota, United States. As of the 2010 census, its population was 20.

Gilstrap Township has one unincorporated community, Petrel.

References

 

Townships in Adams County, North Dakota
Townships in North Dakota